Hosea John Siner (March 20, 1885 – June 10, 1948) was a Major League Baseball player. He played one season with the Boston Doves in 1909.

References

External links

Boston Doves players
Major League Baseball second basemen
Major League Baseball third basemen
Major League Baseball shortstops
1885 births
1948 deaths
Baseball players from Indiana
Calumet Aristocrats players
South Bend Greens players
Monmouth Browns players
Jackson Convicts players
Danville Speakers players
Great Falls Electrics players
People from Sullivan County, Indiana
Shelbyville Queen Citys players